Carex rossii, commonly known as Ross's sedge, is a hardy species of sedge that is often a pioneer species in areas with little or no established vegetation, or in places where disturbance has occurred. Ross's sedge grows in a variety of habitats throughout much of western North America, from Alaska to Ontario, south to New Mexico and California. It flowers in May and June.

Taxonomy
Carex rossii was first described by Francis Boott in Hooker's Flora Boreali-Americana (1839). The type locality was listed as "Hab. N. W. Coast. Douglas. Rocky Mountains. Drummond" (sic)".

Description
The pale to dark green leaves are usually longer than the stems. The inflorescences contain one or more staminate flower spikes above more rounded pistillate spikes. The fruit is three-sided, and covered in a greenish or brownish perigynium.

Distribution and habitat
Carex rossii is native to, and sometimes abundant in, Alaska and subarctic Canada (Nunavut, Northwest Territories, and Yukon Territory); western Canada (Alberta, British Columbia, Manitoba, and Saskatchewan); and the contiguous U.S. (Arizona, California, Colorado, the Dakotas, Idaho, Minnesota, Montana, Nevada, New Mexico, Oregon, Utah, Washington, and Wyoming.) It is found only sporadically in Ontario, Michigan, and Nebraska.

It grows in many habitat types, including wet and dry areas in forest, sagebrush, prairie, and alpine meadows.

References

External links
UC CalPhotos gallery: Carex rossii 

rossii
Flora of Canada
Flora of the United States
Plants described in 1839